Pierre-Louis Lions (born 11 August 1956) is a French mathematician. He is known for a number of contributions to the fields of partial differential equations and the calculus of variations. He was a recipient of the 1994 Fields Medal and the 1991 Prize of the Philip Morris tobacco and cigarette company.

Biography
Lions graduated from the École normale supérieure  in 1977, and received his doctorate from the University of Pierre and Marie Curie in 1979. He holds the position of Professor of Partial differential equations and their applications at the Collège de France in Paris as well as a position at École Polytechnique. Since 2014, he has also been a visiting professor at the University of Chicago.

In 1979, Lions married Lila Laurenti, with whom he has one son. Lions' parents were Andrée Olivier and the renowned mathematician Jacques-Louis Lions, at the time a professor at the University of Nancy, and from 1991 through 1994 the President of the International Mathematical Union.

Awards and honors
In 1994, while working at the University of Paris-Dauphine, Lions received the International Mathematical Union's prestigious Fields Medal. He was cited for his contributions to viscosity solutions, the Boltzmann equation, and the calculus of variations. He has also received the French Academy of Science's Prix Paul Doistau–Émile Blutet (in 1986) and Ampère Prize (in 1992).

He was an invited professor at the Conservatoire national des arts et métiers (2000). He is a doctor honoris causa of Heriot-Watt University (Edinburgh), EPFL (2010), Narvik University College (2014), and of the City University of Hong-Kong and is listed as an ISI highly cited researcher.

Mathematical work

Operator theory
Lions' earliest work dealt with the functional analysis of Hilbert spaces. His first published article, in 1977, was a contribution to the vast literature on convergence of certain iterative algorithms to fixed points of a given nonexpansive self-map of a closed convex subset of Hilbert space. In collaboration with his thesis advisor Haïm Brézis, Lions gave new results about maximal monotone operators in Hilbert space, proving one of the first convergence results for Bernard Martinet and R. Tyrrell Rockafellar's proximal point algorithm. In the time since, there have been a large number of modifications and improvements of such results.

With Bertrand Mercier, Lions proposed a "forward-backward splitting algorithm" for finding a zero of the sum of two maximal monotone operators. Their algorithm can be viewed as an abstract version of the well-known Douglas−Rachford and Peaceman−Rachford numerical algorithms for computation of solutions to parabolic partial differential equations. The Lions−Mercier algorithms and their proof of convergence have been particularly influential in the literature on operator theory and its applications to numerical analysis. A similar method was studied at the same time by Gregory Passty.

Calculus of variations
The mathematical study of the steady-state Schrödinger–Newton equation, also called the Choquard equation, was initiated in a seminal article of Elliott Lieb. It is inspired by plasma physics via a standard approximation technique in quantum chemistry. Lions showed that one could apply standard methods such as the mountain pass theorem, together with some technical work of Walter Strauss, in order to show that a generalized steady-state Schrödinger–Newton equation with a radially symmetric generalization of the gravitational potential is necessarily solvable by a radially symmetric function.

The partial differential equation

has received a great deal of attention in the mathematical literature. Lions' extensive work on this equation is concerned with the existence of rotationally symmetric solutions as well as estimates and existence for boundary value problems of various type. In the interest of studying solutions on all of Euclidean space, where standard compactness theory does not apply, Lions established a number of compactness results for functions with symmetry. With Henri Berestycki and Lambertus Peletier, Lions used standard ODE shooting methods to directly study the existence of rotationally symmetric solutions. However, sharper results were obtained two years later by Berestycki and Lions by variational methods. They considered the solutions of the equation as rescalings of minima of a constrained optimization problem, based upon a modified Dirichlet energy. Making use of the Schwarz symmetrization, there exists a minimizing sequence for the infimization problem which consists of positive and rotationally symmetric functions. So they were able to show that there is a minimum which is also rotationally symmetric and nonnegative. By adapting the critical point methods of Felix Browder, Paul Rabinowitz, and others, Berestycki and Lions also demonstrated the existence of infinitely many (not always positive) radially symmetric solutions to the PDE. Maria Esteban and Lions investigated the nonexistence of solutions in a number of unbounded domains with Dirichlet boundary data. Their basic tool is a Pohozaev-type identity, as previously reworked by Berestycki and Lions. They showed that such identities can be effectively used with Nachman Aronszajn's unique continuation theorem to obtain the triviality of solutions under some general conditions. Significant "a priori" estimates for solutions were found by Lions in collaboration with Djairo Guedes de Figueiredo and Roger Nussbaum.

In more general settings, Lions introduced the "concentration-compactness principle," which characterizes when minimizing sequences of functionals may fail to subsequentially converge. His first work dealt with the case of translation-invariance, with applications to several problems of applied mathematics, including the Choquard equation. He was also able to extend parts of his work with Berestycki to settings without any rotational symmetry. By making use of Abbas Bahri's topological methods and min-max theory, Bahri and Lions were able to establish multiplicity results for these problems. Lions also considered the problem of dilation invariance, with natural applications to optimizing functions for dilation-invariant functional inequalities such as the Sobolev inequality. He was able to apply his methods to give a new perspective on previous works on geometric problems such as the Yamabe problem and harmonic maps. With Thierry Cazenave, Lions applied his concentration-compactness results to establish orbital stability of certain symmetric solutions of nonlinear Schrödinger equations which admit variational interpretations and energy-conserving solutions.

Transport and Boltzmann equations
In 1988, François Golse, Lions, Benoît Perthame, and Rémi Sentis studied the transport equation, which is a first-order linear partial differential equation. They showed that if the first-order coefficients are randomly chosen according to some probability distribution, then the corresponding function values are distributed with regularity which is enhanced from the original probability distribution. These results were later extended by DiPerna, Lions, and Meyer. In the physical sense, such results, known as velocity-averaging lemmas, correspond to the fact that macroscopic observables have greater smoothness than their microscopic rules directly indicate. According to Cédric Villani, it is unknown if it is possible to instead use the explicit representation of solutions of the transport equation to derive these properties.

The classical Picard–Lindelöf theorem deals with integral curves of Lipschitz-continuous vector fields. By viewing integral curves as characteristic curves for a transport equation in multiple dimensions, Lions and Ronald DiPerna initiated the broader study of integral curves of Sobolev vector fields. DiPerna and Lions' results on the transport equation were later extended by Luigi Ambrosio to the setting of bounded variation, and by Alessio Figalli to the context of stochastic processes.

DiPerna and Lions were able to prove the global existence of solutions to the Boltzmann equation. Later, by applying the methods of Fourier integral operators, Lions established estimates for the Boltzmann collision operator, thereby finding compactness results for solutions of the Boltzmann equation. As a particular application of his compactness theory, he was able to show that solutions subsequentially converge at infinite time to Maxwell distributions. DiPerna and Lions also established a similar result for the Maxwell−Vlasov equations.

Viscosity solutions
Michael Crandall and Lions introduced the notion of viscosity solution, which is a kind of generalized solution of Hamilton–Jacobi equations. Their definition is significant since they were able to establish a well-posedness theory in such a generalized context. The basic theory of viscosity solutions was further worked out in collaboration with Lawrence Evans. Using a min-max quantity, Lions and Jean-Michel Lasry considered mollification of functions on Hilbert space which preserve analytic phenomena. Their approximations are naturally applicable to Hamilton-Jacobi equations, by regularizing sub- or super-solutions. Using such techniques, Crandall and Lions extended their analysis of Hamilton-Jacobi equations to the infinite-dimensional case, proving a comparison principle and a corresponding uniqueness theorem.

Crandall and Lions investigated the numerical analysis of their viscosity solutions, proving convergence results both for a finite difference scheme and artificial viscosity.

The comparison principle underlying Crandall and Lions' notion of viscosity solution makes their definition naturally applicable to second-order elliptic partial differential equations, given the maximum principle. Crandall, Ishii, and Lions' survey article on viscosity solutions for such equations has become a standard reference work.

Mean field games
With Jean-Michel Lasry, Lions has contributed to the development of mean-field game theory.

Major publications

Articles.

Textbooks.

References

External links
College de France his resume at the Collège de France website (in French)
 
 
 

1956 births
Living people
People from Grasse
Academic staff of the Collège de France
20th-century French mathematicians
21st-century French mathematicians
Fields Medalists
Mathematical analysts
École Normale Supérieure alumni
Lycée Louis-le-Grand alumni
Members of the French Academy of Sciences
PDE theorists
International Mathematical Olympiad participants
Academic staff of Nancy-Université
Prix Paul Doistau–Émile Blutet laureates
University of Chicago staff